Kyrsten Sinema (born 1976) is an American politician from Arizona.

Sinema may also refer to:

 Sinema (DVD), a concert DVD by the band Drowning Pool
 Sinema (album), 2014 album by Swoope

See also
 Sinemia, online movie-ticket subscription service
 Cinema (disambiguation)

Disambiguation pages with surname-holder lists
Dutch-language surnames